Stuart Dischell (born May 29, 1954 in Atlantic City, New Jersey) is an American poet and Professor in English Creative Writing in the Master of Fine Arts Program at the University of North Carolina at Greensboro.

Career

Stuart Dischell studied Literature at Antioch College and received his Master of Fine Arts degree at the Writers workshop of the University of Iowa, where he studied poetry with Donald Justice, Stanley Plumly and Jon Anderson. After graduating Iowa, he moved to Cambridge, Massachusetts and taught at Boston University. Since 1992, he has taught Creative Writing in the Master of Fine Arts Program at the University of North Carolina at Greensboro. He also taught in the Sarah Lawrence Summer Literary Seminars and in the Low Residency MFA Program for Writers  at Warren Wilson College.

Publications

Animate Earth (Limited edition), Jeanne Duvall Editions, 1988
Good Hope Road (National Poetry Series), Viking Books, 1993
Evening and Avenues, Penguin Books, 1996
Dig Safe Penguin Books, 2003
Backwards Days, Penguin Books, 2007 
Touch Monkey, Forklift Ink., 2013 
Standing on Z, Unicorn Press, 2016
Children with Enemies, University Of Chicago Press, 2017

Stuart Dischell has also been published in anthologies like Essential Pleasures: A New Anthology of Poems to Read Aloud, Hammer and Blaze: A Gathering of Contemporary American Poets  The Pushcart prize, XIX, 1994-1995: best of the small presses, and Good Poems  and in various media such as  The Atlantic, New Republic, Agni, From the Fishouse,  Ploughshares, Slate, The Kenyon Review and the Alaska Quarterly Review.

Awards and honors

National Poetry Series Award, 1991
Pushcart Prize, 1994
National Endowment for the Arts Fellowship, 1996
North Carolina Arts Fellowship, 2001
John Simon Guggenheim Memorial Foundation Fellowship, 2004
National Endowment for the Arts Fellowship, 2008.

References

External links 
 Stuart Dischell's website: http://www.stuartdischellpoetry.com/
 Stuart Dischell's page on North Carolina University in Greensboro website: http://mfagreensboro.org/faculty/stuart-dischell/
 National Endowment for the Arts: http://arts.gov/writers-corner/bio/stuart-dischell
 John Simon Guggenheim Memorial Foundation: http://www.gf.org/fellows/all-fellows/stuart-dischell/
 Academy of American Poets: http://www.poets.org/poetsorg/poet/stuart-dischell
The Atlantic
New Republic
Agni
From the Fishouse
Ploughshares
Slate
The Kenyon Review
Alaska Quarterly Review

Writers from Atlantic City, New Jersey
American male poets
University of Iowa alumni
1954 births
Living people